The Montmorency Falls is a large waterfall on the Montmorency River in Quebec, Canada.

Location
The area surrounding the falls is protected within the Montmorency Falls Park. The falls are at the mouth of the Montmorency River where it drops over the cliff shore into the Saint Lawrence River, opposite the western end of the Île d'Orleans. The waterfalls are 83 m (272') tall, a full 30 m (99') higher than Niagara Falls.

Access and tourism
Around 970,000 visitors a year visit Montmorency Falls. There are staircases that allow visitors to view the falls from several different perspectives. A suspension bridge over the crest of the falls provides access to both sides of the park. There is also a funitel that carries passengers between the base and the top of the falls. In the summer the park hosts an international fireworks competition with the falls as a backdrop.

During summer months, the falls give off a yellow glow due to high iron content in the waterbed.

The Ice Hotel was located at Montmorency Falls for its first year.

In July 2019, it was announced that the Montmorency Falls tourist site will be getting a $33-million makeover.

In popular culture 
The Falls were the site of a key scene between the lead actors in the 1947 film Whispering City, which was filmed on location.

In his poem "Sleep and Poetry" (1816), John Keats says that human life is "a poor Indian's sleep / While his boat hastens to the monstrous steep / Of Montmorency." Recreational sleighing on the frozen falls is recorded in Letitia Elizabeth Landon's poetical illustration, The Montmorency Waterfall and Cone, to an engraving of a painting by W. Purser, published in Fisher's Drawing Room Scrap Book, 1836.

The Falls appeared during the finale of The Amazing Race Canada 5 in 2017 and were the site of the episode's first task in which competitors scaled a cargo net suspended over the Falls.

Gallery

See also
 Canyon Sainte-Anne
 Charlevoix tourist train
List of Waterfalls
 Sépaq

References
Réseau Sépaq, Parc de la Chute-Montmorency Historic Site brochure, 2003.

External links

 Vivre Au Canada.tv: Montmorency Falls during summer
 
 

Aerial tramways in Canada
Landforms of Quebec City
Pedestrian bridges in Canada
Protected areas of Capitale-Nationale
Suspension bridges in Canada
Tourist attractions in Quebec City
Waterfalls of Quebec